Per Johan Valentin Anger  (7 December 1913 – 25 August 2002) was a Swedish diplomat. Anger was Raoul Wallenberg's co-worker at the Swedish legation in Budapest during World War II when many Jews were saved because they were supplied with Swedish passports. After the war, he spent a lot of time trying to clarify Wallenberg's fate.

Early career and World War II
Born in Gothenburg, Anger studied law at Stockholm University and later at Uppsala University. After graduating in November 1939, he was drafted into the Army. Soon afterwards, the Ministry for Foreign Affairs offered him a trainee position at the Swedish legation in Berlin, which he began in January 1940. Anger was assigned to the trade department, but after the legation received information about an impending Nazi attack on Norway and Denmark, he became involved in relaying intelligence to Stockholm. In June 1941, he returned to Stockholm, where he worked on trade relations between Sweden and Hungary. In November 1942, he was sent to Budapest as Second Secretary at the Swedish legation.

After Germany invaded Hungary on 19 March 1944, Anger became involved in efforts to aid Hungarian Jews. Anger originated the idea of issuing Swedish provisional passports and special certificates to protect Jews from internment and deportation. Seven hundred of these documents were issued initially. Although the legality of the documents was doubtful, the Hungarian government agreed to recognize their bearers as Swedish citizens. On 9 July, Raoul Wallenberg arrived in Budapest. He immediately extended Anger's initiative, introducing colorful protective passes (Schutzpasse) and creating "safe houses" throughout the city. Anger and Wallenberg worked together, often literally snatching people from transports and death marches. After the Soviets invaded in January 1945, both Anger and Wallenberg were taken into custody. Anger was released three months later, but Wallenberg never emerged again, becoming one of the 20th century's most famous missing persons.

Later career
After the war, Anger served in numerous diplomatic posts in Egypt, Ethiopia, France, Austria and the United States. He later became head of Sweden's international aid program and served as ambassador to Australia, Canada and the Bahamas. Throughout his post-war career, Anger led efforts to learn what happened to Wallenberg, even meeting personally with Soviet General Secretary Mikhail Gorbachev in the 1980s. In 2000, the Russian government finally acknowledged that Wallenberg and his driver died in Soviet custody in 1947, although the exact circumstances of their deaths remain unclear.

Anger died in Stockholm after suffering a stroke.

Honors
In 1982, Anger was recognized by Yad Vashem as one of the Righteous Among the Nations and in 1995 he was honored with the Hungarian Republic's Order of Merit.

In 1995, Anger was awarded the Wallenberg Medal by the University of Michigan in recognition of his extraordinary courage and humanitarian commitment.

In 2000, he was awarded honorary Israeli citizenship. In 2001, the American Swedish Historical Museum presented him with the Spirit of Raoul Wallenberg Humanitarian Award.

In April, 2002 Swedish Prime Minister Göran Persson awarded Anger the Illis Quorum Meruere Labores (For Those Whose Labors Have Deserved It) for his actions during and after the war. This is the highest award that can be conferred upon an individual Swedish citizen by the Government of Sweden.

Per Anger Prize
The Per Anger Prize was instituted by the Swedish Government to honor the memory of ambassador Per Anger and is awarded for humanitarian work and initiatives in the name of democracy. The prize is awarded to individuals or groups who have distinguished themselves either in the past or in more recent times.  The Prize is administered and awarded by the Forum for Living History.

Prize winners

See also

Raoul Wallenberg

References

Other sources

External links
Jewish Virtual Library
Per Anger award
Per Anger - Holocaust Heroes Budapest

1913 births
2002 deaths
Swedish Righteous Among the Nations
Swedish people of World War II
Raoul Wallenberg
Per Anger Prize
Prisoners and detainees of the Soviet Union
Swedish people imprisoned abroad
Recipients of the Order of Merit of the Republic of Hungary
Consuls-general of Sweden
Ambassadors of Sweden to Australia
Ambassadors of Sweden to Canada
Ambassadors of Sweden to the Bahamas
Recipients of the Illis quorum